Maciej "Matt" Zbyszewski (born August 21, 1981 in Jasień) is a male beach volleyball and volleyball player and coach from Canada who won the silver medal at the NORCECA Circuit 2009 at Puerto Vallarta playing with Josh Binstock.

He won the silver medal at the 2008 SO Pro Beach Volleyball Tournament, partnering with Jessi Lelliott. That year he took the gold medal at the Canadian National Beach Volleyball Championships, partnering Josh Binstock, also in 2009. At the Center of Gravity 2009 he won the silver medal, playing with Josh Binstock.

College
He played with Indiana University-Purdue University Fort Wayne where he became AVCA "All American" First Team and also All American by Volleyball Magazine, 2004 MIVA Player of the Year, 6 times Player of the week between 2004 and 2005 also in 2005 MIVA All-Academic Team. In 2005 he also won the Indiana-Purdue Student Newspapers award The Communicator’s "Most Valuable Athlete Award ".

Clubs
  Omonoia Nicosia (2006–2007)
  UD Vecindario (2007–2008)

Awards

Individuals

NCAA
 2005 The Communicator’s "Most Valuable Athlete Award "
 2005 MIVA - Two times "Player of the Week"
 2005 MIVA "All-Academic Team"
 2004 MIVA - "Player of the Year"
 2004 MIVA - Four times "Player of the Week"
 2004 AVCA "All-American" first team 
 2004 Volleyball Magazine "All-American"

National Team
 NORCECA Beach Volleyball Circuit Puerto Vallarta 2009  Silver Medal
 NORCECA Beach Volleyball Circuit Manzanillo 2009  Bronze Medal

Beach volleyball
 2009 Canadian National Beach Volleyball Championships  Gold Medal
 2009 Center Of Gravity Tournament  Silver Medal
 2008 Canadian National Beach Volleyball Championships  Gold Medal
 2007 Canadian National Beach Volleyball Championships  Silver Medal
 2007 So Pro Beach Volleyball Championships  Gold Medal

External links
 BV Database Profile
 FIVB BV Profile
 Canadian Sport Centre Profile

References

Living people
1981 births
Canadian expatriate sportspeople in Spain
Canadian expatriate sportspeople in the United States
Canadian expatriate sportspeople in Cyprus
Canadian men's beach volleyball players
Indiana University – Purdue University Fort Wayne alumni
Polish emigrants to Canada
Volleyball players from Toronto